Craig Kimmorley (born 18 September 1974) is a former professional rugby league footballer  who played during the 1990s. He played for the Newcastle Knights in 1995, the Hunter Mariners, the Adelaide Rams in 1998 and finally the Sydney City Roosters in 1999. He is the older brother of former NSW and Australian halfback Brett Kimmorley.

References

External links
http://www.rugbyleagueproject.org/players/Craig_Kimmorley/summary.html

1974 births
Living people
Adelaide Rams players
Australian rugby league players
Hunter Mariners players
Newcastle Knights players
Sydney Roosters players
Valentine-Eleebana Red Devils players
Rugby league players from Newcastle, New South Wales
Rugby league five-eighths
Rugby league halfbacks